Novopavlovka is the name of several inhabited localities in Russia.

Republic of Bashkortostan
As of 2010, one rural locality in the Republic of Bashkortostan bears this name:
Novopavlovka, Republic of Bashkortostan, a selo in Isyangulovsky Selsoviet of Zianchurinsky District

Krasnodar Krai
As of 2010, one rural locality in Krasnodar Krai bears this name:
Novopavlovka, Krasnodar Krai, a selo in Novopavlovsky Rural Okrug of Beloglinsky District

Lipetsk Oblast
As of 2010, two rural localities in Lipetsk Oblast bear this name:
Novopavlovka, Chaplyginsky District, Lipetsk Oblast, a village in Novopolyansky Selsoviet of Chaplyginsky District
Novopavlovka, Volovsky District, Lipetsk Oblast, a village in Lipovsky Selsoviet of Volovsky District

Nizhny Novgorod Oblast
As of 2010, one rural locality in Nizhny Novgorod Oblast bears this name:
Novopavlovka, Nizhny Novgorod Oblast, a village in Novinsky Selsoviet of Bogorodsky District

Omsk Oblast
As of 2010, one rural locality in Omsk Oblast bears this name:
Novopavlovka, Omsk Oblast, a village in Lukyanovsky Rural Okrug of Odessky District

Orenburg Oblast
As of 2010, one rural locality in Orenburg Oblast bears this name:
Novopavlovka, Orenburg Oblast, a selo in Novopavlovsky Selsoviet of Akbulaksky District

Penza Oblast
As of 2010, one rural locality in Penza Oblast bears this name:
Novopavlovka, Penza Oblast, a selo in Pokrovo-Berezovsky Selsoviet of Penzensky District

Rostov Oblast
As of 2010, three rural localities in Rostov Oblast bear this name:
Novopavlovka, Kasharsky District, Rostov Oblast, a selo in Kasharskoye Rural Settlement of Kasharsky District
Novopavlovka, Oktyabrsky District, Rostov Oblast, a khutor in Krasnokutskoye Rural Settlement of Oktyabrsky District
Novopavlovka, Tatsinsky District, Rostov Oblast, a khutor in Mikhaylovskoye Rural Settlement of Tatsinsky District

Samara Oblast
As of 2010, two rural localities in Samara Oblast bear this name:
Novopavlovka, Bolsheglushitsky District, Samara Oblast, a selo in Bolsheglushitsky District
Novopavlovka, Krasnoarmeysky District, Samara Oblast, a settlement in Krasnoarmeysky District

Saratov Oblast
As of 2010, two rural localities in Saratov Oblast bear this name:
Novopavlovka (selo), Pugachyovsky District, Saratov Oblast, a selo in Pugachyovsky District
Novopavlovka (settlement), Pugachyovsky District, Saratov Oblast, a settlement in Pugachyovsky District

Tambov Oblast
As of 2010, one rural locality in Tambov Oblast bears this name:
Novopavlovka, Tambov Oblast, a village in Pavlodarsky Selsoviet of Zherdevsky District

Vladimir Oblast
As of 2010, one rural locality in Vladimir Oblast bears this name:
Novopavlovka, Vladimir Oblast, a village in Yuryev-Polsky District

Voronezh Oblast
As of 2010, two rural localities in Voronezh Oblast bear this name:
Novopavlovka, Mikhaylovskoye Rural Settlement, Kantemirovsky District, Voronezh Oblast, a khutor in Mikhaylovskoye Rural Settlement of Kantemirovsky District
Novopavlovka, Zaytsevskoye Rural Settlement, Kantemirovsky District, Voronezh Oblast, a settlement in Zaytsevskoye Rural Settlement of Kantemirovsky District

Zabaykalsky Krai
As of 2010, one urban locality in Zabaykalsky Krai bears this name:
Novopavlovka, Zabaykalsky Krai, an urban-type settlement in Petrovsk-Zabaykalsky District